Two Times Adam, One Time Eve (German: 2 x Adam, 1 x Eve) is a 1959 West German comedy film directed by Franz M. Lang and starring Heidi Brühl, Matthias Fuchs and Brigitte Grothum.

The film's sets were designed by the art director Ernst Schomer.

The film is a West German remake of the 1931 Finnish film Aatamin puvussa ja vähän Eevankin.

Cast
 Heidi Brühl as Kaarina
 Matthias Fuchs as Peter
 Brigitte Grothum as Silja
 Alfred Balthoff as Kalevi
 Walter Buschhoff as Matti
 Paul Esser as Rat Granberg
 Benno Hoffmann as Lehtinen
 Karl John as Wickström
 Klaus Kindler as Aarne
 Gustav Knuth as Viirimäki
 Carsta Löck as Sinikka
 Ralf Wolter as Paavo

References

Bibliography
 Goble, Alan. The Complete Index to Literary Sources in Film. Walter de Gruyter, 1999.

External links 
 

1959 films
1959 comedy films
German comedy films
West German films
1950s German-language films
Films based on Finnish novels
Remakes of Finnish films
1950s German films

de:2 x Adam, 1 x Eva